CPOX may refer to:
Coproporphyrinogen III oxidase
Catalytic partial oxidation